Wizards of Oz were a briefly existing Australian jazz quartet from the late 1980s. The members were Dale Barlow on tenor saxophone, Paul Grabowsky on piano and the Necks' band mates Lloyd Swanton on bass and Tony Buck on drums. They released one album, Soundtrack (1988), which won the 1989 ARIA Award for Best Jazz Album. In 2017 Mal Stanley of Jazztrack on ABC Jazz described it as "a standout album in the Australian Jazz pantheon, and it inspired many young local players at the time of its release."

Members

Dale Barlow – tenor saxophone
Tony Buck – drums
Paul Grabowsky – piano
Lloyd Swanton – bass

Discography

Awards

ARIA Music Awards

The ARIA Music Awards is an annual awards ceremony that recognises excellence, innovation, and achievement across all genres of Australian music. They commenced in 1987. 

! 
|-
| 1989
| Soundtrack
| Best Jazz Album
| 
| 
|-

References

External links
Paul Grabowsky Soundtrack

Australian jazz ensembles
ARIA Award winners
Musical groups established in 1987
Musical groups disestablished in 1988
1987 establishments in Australia